Chattogram Bandar is a thana of Chattogram District in Chattogram Division, Bangladesh.

Geography
It has 30762 households and total area 44.63 km2.

Demographics
At the 1991 Bangladesh census, Chittagong port had a population of 187,739, of whom 100,373 were aged 18 or older. Males constituted 57.22% of the population, and females 42.78%. Chittagong port had an average literacy rate of 56.5% (7+ years), against the national average of 32.4%.

See also
 Upazilas of Bangladesh
 Districts of Bangladesh
 Divisions of Bangladesh

References

Thanas of Chittagong District